Margaret O'Rene Ryan (August 28, 1924 – October 30, 2004) was an American dancer and actress, best known for starring in a series of movie musicals at Universal Pictures with Donald O'Connor and Gloria Jean.

Career 
Ryan joined her parents' vaudeville act, "The Merry Dancing Ryans", before she was 3 years old, and appeared in her first film, Wedding of Jack and Jill (1929) when she was 4. She attended Hollywood Professional School.

Her singing, acting, and dancing skills were noticed by song-and-dance actor George Murphy, who helped her get a role in 1937's Top of the Town. However, her entry in the book Vaudeville old & new: an encyclopedia of variety performances in America, Volume 1 notes, "[B]y then she was outgrowing the kiddie parts, yet not old enough for the teenage roles."

She continued working in small roles until 1942, when she had a solo number in the feature film What's Cookin'?. The Gloria Jean-Donald O'Connor-Peggy Ryan team were a great hit with audiences and exhibitors, and the three teens made five features together. Her screen character in these films was usually brash, wisecracking, and boy-crazy. In 1944, Ryan advanced to more elaborate productions, in support of Jack Oakie and Abbott and Costello.

She left Universal in 1945 and married James Cross that same year; they were divorced in 1952. She returned to the screen with dancer Ray McDonald for 1949's There's a Girl in My Heart and Shamrock Hill, and 1953's All Ashore. They wed in 1953 and toured together in a nightclub act before being divorced in 1957. Her third marriage, in 1958, was to Hawaii columnist Eddie Sherman, following which she left movies for choreography and semiretirement. Sherman adopted her two children from her previous marriages.

On television, Ryan played a recurring role as secretary Jenny Sherman in Hawaii Five-O from 1969–76.

In later years, she trained Las Vegas showgirls in tap dancing. Her last public performance, at her 80th birthday party, was a hilarious song-and-dance routine for her former Universal studio colleagues. She continued to teach tap until two days before her death.

Death
Ryan died at the age of 80 after two strokes. Her ashes were scattered under the Hollywood sign in Hollywood, California. She was survived by two children and five grandchildren. One of her children is retired actress Kerry Sherman.

Filmography
Features:

 Top of the Town (1937) - Peggy
 The Women Men Marry (1937) - Mary Jane
 The Flying Irishman (1939) - Miss Edith Corrigan - Doug's Sister (uncredited)
 She Married a Cop (1939) - Trudy
 The Grapes of Wrath (1940) - Hungry Girl (uncredited)
 Sailor's Lady (1940) - Ellen 
 What's Cookin'? (1942) - Peggy
 Girls' Town (1942) - Penny
 Private Buckaroo (1942) - Peggy
 Miss Annie Rooney (1942) - Myrtle
 Give Out, Sisters (1942) - Peggy
 Get Hep to Love (1942) - Betty Blake
 When Johnny Comes Marching Home (1942) - Dusty
 Mister Big (1943) - Peggy
 Top Man (1943) - Jane Warren
 Chip Off the Old Block (1944) - Himself
 Follow the Boys (1944) - Peggy Ryan
 This Is the Life (1944) - Sally McGuire
 The Merry Monahans (1944) - Patsy Monahan
 Babes on Swing Street (1944) - Trudy Costello
 Bowery to Broadway (1944) - Specialty Number
 Here Come the Co-Eds (1945) - Patty Gayle
 Patrick the Great (1945) - Judy Watkin
 That's the Spirit (1945) - Sheila Gogarty
 On Stage Everybody (1945) - Molly Sullivan
 Men in Her Diary (1945) - Doris Mann
 Shamrock Hill (1949) - Eileen Rogan
 There's a Girl in My Heart (1949) - Sally Mullin
 All Ashore (1953) - Gay Night

Short subjects:
 Billy Rose's Casa Mañana Revue (1938) - Peggy Dixon
 A Night at the Troc (1939)
 Varsity Vanities (1940)
 Universal Musical Short 3655: Singin' and Swingin (1950)

Television work
 Hawaii Five-O (appeared in 49 episodes between 1968–1976)
 Pleasure Palace (1980)

See also
 List of dancers

References

External links

 
 

1924 births
2004 deaths
Actresses from California
American tap dancers
American female dancers
American film actresses
American television actresses
People from Long Beach, California
Vaudeville performers
20th-century American dancers
20th-century American actresses
21st-century American women